Archery at the 1980 Summer Paralympics consisted of fifteen events, ten for men and five for women.

Medal table

Participating nations

Medal summary

Men's events

Women's events

References 

 

1980 Summer Paralympics events
1980
Paralympics